Mark Agyekum (born 21 August 1992) is a Ghanaian professional footballer who plays as a forward for Ghanaian Premier League side Ashanti Gold.

Career 
Agyekum has been part of the Obuasi-based club Ashanti Gold since 2018. On 13 January 2020, Agyekum was adjudged the man of the match award in a 2–0 win against Eleven Wonders, after scoring 1 goal and creating another. He made an assist for Emmanuel Owusu to score the first goal of the match in the 29th minute and scored a goal in the 45th minute to secure the win. In November 2020, he was ruled out for 2-weeks along with Ibrahim Samed after both received injuries. He was a member of the squad that featured for the club in the 2020–21 CAF Confederation Cup.

References

External links 

 
 

Living people
1992 births
Association football forwards
Ghanaian footballers
Ashanti Gold SC players
Ghana Premier League players